The Szigetköz (literally "island alley";) is an island on the Danube in Western Hungary, part of the Little Hungarian Plain.

See also
Geography of Hungary
Little Hungarian Plain
Žitný ostrov

References

 
 

Islands of the Danube
River islands of Hungary